The olive-capped warbler (Setophaga pityophila) is a species of New World warbler that is native to the western and eastern ends of Cuba as well as Grand Bahama and the Abaco Islands in the Bahamas. Its natural habitat is pine forests and occasionally adjacent mixed forests.

References

External links

olive-capped warbler
Birds of the Bahamas
Birds of Cuba
olive-capped warbler
Taxonomy articles created by Polbot